Retox may refer to:

 Retox (album), a 2007 release by the Norwegian rock band Turbonegro
 "Retox" (song), a 2002 release by the English DJ Fatboy Slim
 Retox (band), a 2010s American punk band